"Thinking with My Dick" is a song by American rapper Kevin Gates from his tenth mixtape Stranger than Fiction (2013). It features American rapper Juicy J and was produced by Arthur McArthur. In March 2022, the song gained newfound popularity due to widespread use on the video-sharing app TikTok.

Composition and critical reception
David Jeffries of AllMusic wrote, "jump right to the hedonistic 'Thinking with My D**k,' where the worlds of Pimp C and cloud rap collide, creating quite the druggy, strip-club spectacle." Derek Staples of Consequence of Sound regarded the song as misogynist, writing that it provides "a look back at Gates' vice-laden adolescence".

TikTok use
On March 1, 2022, at a Mardi Gras celebration in Lafayette, Louisiana, local man John E. Weatherall III took a video of another man, Steven Barbosa, dancing and rapping to the song while holding an American flag cup, with a woman in the background clapping. The video was posted on TikTok and immediately went viral; the song became significantly used in many videos on TikTok. In March 2022, the song was re-released as a single and peaked at number 37 on the Billboard Hot 100. Gates added the song to his album Khaza (2022) to increase sales.

At a concert at the Cajundome around May 2022, Gates brought Barbosa with him onstage during his performance of the song.

Charts

Certifications

References

2013 songs
2022 singles
Kevin Gates songs
Juicy J songs
Songs written by Juicy J
Atlantic Records singles